Ratarda excellens is a moth in the family Cossidae. It is found in Taiwan.

The length of the forewings is about 16 mm for males and 22 mm for females. The ground colour of the forewings of the males is brown, slightly tinged with a golden lustre. The costal and dorsal areas are pale. There are irregular pale brown patches edged with dark brown, forming several smooth lines. The hindwings are uniform dark brown. There is strong sexual dimorphism. Females have blackish brown forewings, slightly tinged with a bluish lustre and with irregular black patches forming several lines.

References

Natural History Museum Lepidoptera generic names catalog

Ratardinae
Moths described in 1917